The Hollywood Stars are a professional baseball travel team nominally based in Los Angeles, California. They played their inaugural season in 2017, as a member of the Pecos League, an independent baseball league which is not affiliated with Major League Baseball or Minor League Baseball. They played the 2018 season in the Can-Am League, appearing in a total of 9 games. In 2019, they joined The Western League as a charter team.

Season By Season Results

Roster

References

External links
 Hollywood Stars website
 Pecos League website

Pecos League teams
Baseball teams in Los Angeles
Professional baseball teams in California
Baseball teams established in 2016
Baseball teams disestablished in 2017
2016 establishments in California